Lutheran High School of Kansas City is a parochial Lutheran secondary school in Kansas City, Missouri, that serves 140 students in grades nine through twelve. It is associated with the Lutheran Church–Missouri Synod. As of 2020, its executive director is Dr. Cary Stelmachowicz.

Overview
The Lutheran High School of Kansas City was founded in 1980 with 44 students and nine faculty members, and it graduated its first class in 1983. Over the course of its history, it has had over 800 graduates. The school is accredited by AdvancED, Missouri Non-Public Accreditation, and the National Lutheran School Accreditation.  Eighty-five percent of the student body are involved in at least one extra-curricular activity. The school offers 6 AP/dual credit courses. Students have an average ACT score of 24.8, and 92 percent of graduates move on to attend college.

Various Lutheran elementary schools in the area feed into the high school, including Martin Luther Academy.

Campus
Lutheran High School is located on a 29-acre campus in South Kansas City. The 143,000 square foot educational building includes a full gym, theater, cafeteria, library, science lab, and computer lab. The campus also has its own soccer fields.

The school was originally located on leased property near I-435 and Holmes Road in Kansas City, Missouri. Due to the sale property, the school purchased the former Benjamin Harrison School from the Kansas City, Missouri public school system and relocated in Spring 1985, where the school would remain for 20 years. In Summer 2005, Lutheran High School moved to its current location at 12411 Wornall Road. The current campus is the former home of the Loretto Academy, which occupied the site from 1964 to 1984.

Athletics
Lutheran High School completes in a variety of sports through the Missouri State High School Activities Association. All athletics are headed up by athletic director DJ Dan Bickel. Basketball and Baseball teams compete at the Class 2 level, and all other sports compete at the Class 1 level.

Boys Sports
Basketball
Baseball
Soccer
Cross Country
Track and 
Tennis

Girls Sports
Basketball
Soccer
Cross Country
Track and 
Tennis
Cheerleading
Dance Team
Volleyball

References

External links
Lutheran High School of Kansas City website

High schools in Kansas City, Missouri
Secondary schools affiliated with the Lutheran Church–Missouri Synod
Lutheran schools in Missouri
Private high schools in Missouri